Graham Fransella (born 3 June 1950) is an Australian figurative and abstract painter.

Life
Fransella was born in Harrow, England. He studied at the Bradford School of Art, Yorkshire in the early 1970s, before moving to Melbourne, Australia, in 1975.

Work
Fransella is known for his abstract figurative paintings and prints.  His basic iconography of heads and figures has remained constant throughout his work. His work is represented in private and public collections including the National Gallery of Australia, National Gallery of Victoria, Art Gallery of New South Wales, Queensland Art Gallery, Parliament House, Canberra, the Print Council of Australia and Saatchi and Saatchi, London.

Fransella has been an Archibald Prize finalist, Dobell Prize and Sulman Drawing Prize finalist and has won the Art Gallery of New South Wales Wynne Trustees Watercolour Prize in 2000, 2006, 2007 and 2009.  He was also the subject of an Archibald Prize 2006 finalists entry by Geoffrey Dyer entitled ‘The Abstractionist Graham Fransella’.

Notes

See also
 Art of Australia
 Archibald Prize 2006 finalists
 List of Australian artists

References
Biography, Graham Fransella website

External links
 Graham Fransella website
 State Library of New South Wales 2006 Prize Winners
 State Library of New South Wales 2007 Prize Winners

Australian painters
1950 births
Living people
People from the London Borough of Harrow